is the name of a number of train services that formerly operated in Japan by Japanese National Railways (JNR), and most recently an all-stations service operated by East Japan Railway Company (JR East) until September 1997 on the high-speed Tōhoku Shinkansen in Japan.

History

Express
This continued until the train was renamed  on 1 October 1965.

Limited express
These services were discontinued on 24 November 1975.

Shinkansen
Services initially used 200 series 12-car "E" sets with a Green (first class) car as car 7, and a buffet counter in car 9. Services later used 8-car 200 series "G" sets with a Green (first class) car as car 5, and a buffet counter in car 7.

12-car E sets

8-car G sets

The number of Aoba services was reduced from 1 December 1995, following the introduction of the Nasuno all-stations service, and the name was finally discontinued from 1 October 1997 when the remaining trains were integrated with Yamabiko services.

See also
 List of named passenger trains of Japan

References

Tōhoku Shinkansen
Tōhoku Main Line
Railway services introduced in 1945
Railway services discontinued in 1997
Named Shinkansen trains